A Side Roads Order (SRO) is a statutory order in the UK which authorises a highway authority to make alterations to roads or other highways affected by a trunk road scheme - e.g. stopping up, diverting or connecting them to new trunk road and stopping up and replacing private accesses affected).
It is defined by section 14 of the Highways Act 1980.

References

Roads in the United Kingdom
Statutory Instruments of the United Kingdom